John Charles Groome (March 20, 1862 – August 31, 1930), was the first commissioner of the Pennsylvania State Police from 1905 to 1917. He was the former warden of the Eastern State Penitentiary and a Colonel in World War I.

Biography
He was born in Philadelphia, Pennsylvania on March 20, 1862 to Samuel William Groome and Nancy Andrew Connelly. He graduated from the Protestant Episcopal Academy in 1878. He became a member of the First Troop Philadelphia City Cavalry in 1882. On April 15, 1884  he married Agnes Price Roberts (1868–1937), and had three children.

In the First Troop Philadelphia City Cavalry he was promoted to corporal in 1887, then sergeant in 1889. He was promoted to captain in 1896. He was active in the Homestead Strike in 1892 and the Coal Strike of 1902 in 1902. In 1905 he became the first commissioner of the Pennsylvania State Police. He served as a colonel in World War I.

He retired from the Pennsylvania State Police on February 28, 1920 and died August 31, 1930 at the age of 68.

References

1862 births
1930 deaths
American state police officers
Pennsylvania State Police
People from Philadelphia
Episcopal Academy alumni
Military personnel from Philadelphia
United States Army colonels
United States Army personnel of World War I